The 2021 Washington Spirit season was the club's 11th season of existence and its ninth in the National Women's Soccer League, the top division of women's soccer in the United States.

The season began with the 2021 NWSL Challenge Cup on April 9, 2021 followed by a 24-match regular season. The regular season concluded on October 31, 2021. The Spirit made its first playoff appearance in five years on November 7, 2021, taking down the defending league champion North Carolina Courage in a quarterfinal match at Audi Field. On November 14, Washington took down two-seed OL Reign in Tacoma to advance to the 2021 NWSL Championship Game in Louisville, KY. The following Saturday, November 20, the Spirit earned its first league title with a 2-1 win over the Chicago Red Stars after extra time.

Background 

The 2020 season was the Washington Spirit's seventh season. The season was slated to begin on April 18, 2020 but was postponed due to the COVID-19 pandemic. Ultimately, the NWSL season was cancelled due to the pandemic. The club participated in the NWSL Challenge Cup and the NWSL Fall series which were held in lieu of the regular season. The Challenge Cup was held behind closed doors at the neutral venue of Zions Bank Stadium in Herriman, Utah. The Spirit reached the Quarterfinals of the Challenge Cup and finished in third place in the Fall Series. Combined across all matches, the Spirit had the second best record of matches played during the 2020 season.

Club

Roster

Management and support staff

Non-competitive

Competitive

NWSL Challenge Cup

Standings

Results

NWSL

Standings

Results

Playoffs

Transfers

Transfers in

Transfers out

NWSL Draft picks

Player statistics

Top scorers

Assist leaders

Clean sheets

Disciplinary

References

External links 
 Washington Spirit

2021
Washington Spirit
Washington Spirit
Washington Spirit